Skymaster may refer to:

Airlines
Skymaster Airlines, a defunct Brazilian airline
Skymaster Air Taxi, a defunct American airline

Aircraft
Cessna Skymaster, an American  civil aircraft design
Cessna O-2 Skymaster, an American  military aircraft design
Douglas C-54 Skymaster, an American  military aircraft design

Other uses
Skymaster (ride), a pendulum amusement ride
Skymaster Powered Parachutes, an American powered parachute manufacturer

Characters with the name
Skrullian Skymaster, a member of Marvel Comics' Squadron Supreme